Henrik Wiese (born 22 July 1971) is a German flutist.

Life and career 
Born in Vienna, Wiese studied in his hometown of Hamburg with Ingrid Koch-Dörnbrak and in Munich with Paul Meisen. In 1995, he was engaged as principal flutist at the Bavarian State Opera Munich. In 2006, he moved to the same position in the Bavarian Radio Symphony Orchestra. In 2018, Wiese received a call to the Hochschule für Künste Bremen. Since 2020, he has been teaching at the Hochschule für Musik Nürnberg.

Wiese is a prize-winner of the 1995 Deutscher Musikwettbewerb and the international competitions in Kobe / Japan 1997,  1998, Odense / Denmark Carl Nielsen 1998 and 2000 ARD International Music Competition.

His artistic work is documented by several recordings (CD, radio and television recordings). In addition to the Böhm flute, Wiese also plays the transverse flute and can be heard with this instrument in the "Accademia giocosa". Since 1997, Wiese has worked as an editor for, among others, G. Henle Verlag in Munich, Breitkopf & Härtel in Wiesbaden or Universal Edition in Vienna. His editorial and scholarly interests focus on the works of Wolfgang Amadeus Mozart, Bach's pupil Johann Philipp Kirnberger and Gewandhaus Kapellmeister Carl Reinecke.

Wiese is a synesthesist.

Editions (selection) 
 Mozart: Hafner-Sinfonie KV 385.
 Mozart: Große g-Moll-Sinfonie KV 550
 Mozart: Gran Partita KV 361.
 Mozart: Oboen- bzw. Flötenkonzert KV 314.
 Mozart: Hornkonzerte KV 412, 417, 447 und 495.
 Reinecke: Flute Concerto D major op. 283.
 Weber: Trio for Piano, Flute and Cello, op. 63.
 Wiese: The Flute Audition, Collection of auditions for flute.

Further reading 
 Alain Pâris: Klassische Musik im 20. Jahrhundert. Munich 1997.
 David M. Cumming: International Who's Who in Music and Musicians' directory. Cambridge (GB) 1998 ff.
 Kürschners Deutscher Musik-Kalender. Munich 2002 ff.

References

External links 
 
 Henrik Wiese im Symphonieorchester des Bayerischen Rundfunks
 

German classical flautists
1971 births
Living people
Musicians from Vienna